Pastorius Park is a 16-acre (6.5-ha) park in Philadelphia, Pennsylvania, United States. It is maintained by the Fairmount Park Commission. Established in 1915, the park was named in honor of Francis Pastorius, a leader of early German immigrants to the area. It is located in the Chestnut Hill section of Philadelphia, at Lincoln Drive and Abington Avenue. Its current design is the 1935 work of landscape architect Frederick W.G. Peck (1909-1998).  The park includes a pond and an amphitheater.

The Chestnut Hill Community Association sponsors evening concerts at the park during the summer.

See also
List of parks in Philadelphia

References

Google Map location

Municipal parks in Philadelphia
Chestnut Hill, Philadelphia